Stenacron interpunctatum, the stenacron mayfly, is a species of flatheaded mayfly in the family Heptageniidae. It is found in North America.

References

External links

 

Mayflies
Articles created by Qbugbot
Insects described in 1839